Eagle Materials Inc. is an American producer of building materials based in Dallas, Texas. The company produces cement, concrete, construction aggregate, gypsum, wallboard, paperboard, and sand for hydraulic fracturing.

The company  operates 7 cement plants, 1 slag grinding facility, 17 cement distribution terminals, five gypsum wallboard plants, 3 frac sand wet processing facilities, 3 frac sand drying facilities, and 6 frac sand trans-load locations.

History
The company was founded in 1963 as a division of Centex Construction Company. Between April 1994 and January 30, 2004, the company was known as Centex Construction Products, Inc.

On January 30, 2004, Centex distributed its shares in the company to its shareholders and the company was renamed Eagle Materials Inc.

In May 2005, the company announced a $65 million expansion of its plant in LaSalle, Illinois.

In September 2012, the company acquired plants in Sugar Creek, Missouri and Tulsa, Oklahoma from Lafarge for $446 million.

In October 2014, the company acquired CRS Proppants LLC, a frac sand supplier, for $225 million.

In February 2017, the company acquired a cement plant in Fairborn, Ohio from Cemex for $400 million.

References

External links

Manufacturing companies established in 1963
Companies listed on the New York Stock Exchange
Manufacturing companies based in Dallas
1963 establishments in Texas